Charles Morgan Shipway (born January 6, 1968) is a sailor who represented the United States Virgin Islands. He competed in the Tornado event at the 1992 Summer Olympics.

References

External links
 
 

1968 births
Living people
United States Virgin Islands male sailors (sport)
Olympic sailors of the United States Virgin Islands
Sailors at the 1992 Summer Olympics – Tornado
Place of birth missing (living people)